Ajman Hotel  is a luxury hotel in Ajman, United Arab Emirates. The hotel opened on October 13, 1997. It is located 15.5 mi (25 km) from the Dubai International Airport. Ajman Hotel was managed by Kempinski Hotels and is now operating under SPG - The Luxury Collection. Ajman Hotel is managed by Blazon Hotels.

The hotel is situated on the largest white sand beach in Ajman. Features include a night bar with live entertainment, a bowling club, and a sports bar. 

During the COVID-19 pandemic, the work of the hotel was reduced and health safety measures were adopted.

References

External links
Ajman Hotel

Hotel buildings completed in 1997
Buildings and structures in the Emirate of Ajman
Hotels in the United Arab Emirates
Hotels established in 1997
1998 establishments in the United Arab Emirates